CITGO Asphalt Refining Co. v. Frescati Shipping Co., 589 U.S. ___ (2020), was a United States Supreme Court case dealing with the responsibility of costs of cleanup resulting from a 2004 oil spill on the Delaware River near Paulsboro, New Jersey from the result of a hull rupture. After years of litigation, the Supreme Court ruled in its 7–2 decision that the contract language established between Citgo and Frescati established that Citgo would provide safe berth for the vessel, and thus ultimately responsible for the spill.

Case background

On November 26, 2004, the Athos I, a  single-hull oil tanker carrying  of oil that had traveled from Venezuela was maneuvering to dock at a Citgo dock on the Delaware River near its refinery at Paulsboro. The spill spread downstream affecting the shoreline in more than three states (Pennsylvania, New Jersey, and Delaware), killing over 11,000 birds, temporarily shut down the Salem Nuclear Power Plant, and halted commercial use of the river for several weeks during cleanup efforts. The spill led to passage of the Coast Guard and Maritime Transportation Act of 2006 which among provisions, tripled fines resulting from oil spills from single-hulled vessels to encourage double-hull use, as well as requiring those with knowledge of obstructions in waterways to inform the Coast Guard for immediate removal.

The Athos I was under a time charter from the Frescati Shipping Co. to Star Tankers Inc. under a multi-year contract, while the specific transport from Venezuela to New Jersey was a standard voyage charter between Star Tanker and Citgo. The United States Coast Guard also bore some of the costs. 

As the Oil Pollution Act allows for recovery of cleanup funds from liable parties after the matter, Frescati and the United States Government filed suit against Citgo in 2011 to recover their costs, asserting it was their responsibility to make sure the area around their docks had safe berth for the vessel. The anchor was found to be just within the  safe berth clause in the Star-Citgo voyage charter. Frescati appealed to the Third Circuit, which partially vacated the District Court's ruling. The Third Circuit stated that the District Court had ignored the language of the contract law that still applied to the matter, and remanded the case back for review on this matter. 

Citgo appealed again to the Third Circuit, arguing on the terms that the safe berth passage was considered a duty of due diligence rather than an assurance of safe passage. The Third Circuit rejected Citgo's argument and upheld the ruling in 2018 and further found that Citgo should be held responsible for more of the government's sought damages, as it rejected Citgo's claim that removing the anchor was the Coast Guard's responsibility. In their opinion, the Third Circuit stated that Citgo was attempting to argue for equitable relief in terms of splitting the costs for cleanup, but the case was about contractual relief under the terms of the charter contracts and the Oil Pollution Act.

Supreme Court
Citgo petitioned to the Supreme Court on the question of the safe berth clause being an assurance of safe travel or duty of due diligence, as their case along with others from the Second and Fifth Circuits created a split decision. The Supreme Court accepted the writ of certiorari in April 2019.

Oral arguments were heard on November 9, 2019. Reporters found the Justices mostly sided on a strict contract reading supporting the intention that the safe berth clause was to be read as an assurance of safe travel, as if Citgo wanted to use other less-strict language to reduce their liability, there was many other contract mechanisms available they could have used.

The Court issued its decision on March 30, 2020, affirming the Third Circuit's decision. In the 7-2 majority opinion, Justice Sonia Sotomayor wrote that "We conclude that the language of the safe-berth clause here unambiguously establishes a warranty of safety", and thus Citgo was responsible for assuring the safe berth for the Athos I and the subsequent cleanup from the oil spill. Justice Clarence Thomas wrote a dissenting opinion joined by Justice Samuel Alito, in which he wrote that the language of the safe berth clause was not clear that it implied a warranty, and that there should be an evaluation if this was considered a standard practice in the industry.

References

External links
 

2004 disasters in the United States
2020 in United States case law
Maritime incidents in 2004
Maritime incidents in the United States
Oil spills in the United States
United States admiralty case law
United States Supreme Court cases
United States Supreme Court cases of the Roberts Court
Delaware River
Citgo